Pure Gershwin is a 1987 album by American vocalist Michael Feinstein of songs composed by George Gershwin. This was Feinstein's debut studio recording.

It was Feinstein's first album of Gershwin's music, his two other all-Gershwin albums are Nice Work If You Can Get It: Songs by the Gershwins (1996) and Michael & George: Feinstein Sings Gershwin (1998).

Reception

The Allmusic review by William Ruhlmann awarded the album four ½ stars and said Feinstein's reading of Gershwin was "near perfect", and his piano playing excellent.

Track listing
 "'S Wonderful" - 3:54
 "Love Is Here to Stay" - 3:53
 "Liza (All the Clouds'll Roll Away)" - 5:24
 "The World Is Mine" - 2:56
 "They Can't Take That Away from Me" - 3:36
 "Isn't It a Pity?" - 7:03
 "Let's Call the Whole Thing Off" - 2:43
 "Embraceable You" - 4:33
 "What Causes That?" - 3:19
 "He Loves and She Loves"/"How Long Has This Been Going On?" - 5:49
 "They All Laughed" - 3:03
 "The Girl I Love" - 4:30
 "Someone to Watch over Me" - 4:15

All music composed by George Gershwin, and all lyrics written by Ira Gershwin, additionally Gus Kahn provides lyrics on "Liza (All the Clouds'll Roll Away)"

Personnel
Michael Feinstein - vocals, piano
Ted Hawke - drums
Jim Hughart - double bass
David Ross - piano
Morgan Ames - liner notes
Herb Eiseman - producer
Dennis Sands - engineer
Rosemary Clooney - singing, "Isn't it a pity"

References

Asylum Records albums
Michael Feinstein albums
1987 albums